William Thomas Denton (February 1, 1911 – March 8, 1946) was an American artistic gymnast who competed in the 1932 Summer Olympics.

He was born in Collinsville, Texas and died in Washington, D.C.

In 1932 he won the silver medal in the rings competition.

External links
 profile

1911 births
1946 deaths
American male artistic gymnasts
Gymnasts at the 1932 Summer Olympics
Olympic silver medalists for the United States in gymnastics
Medalists at the 1932 Summer Olympics
People from Grayson County, Texas
20th-century American people